Anatoliy Burdiuhov is a Ukrainian politician and banker.

References

External links
 Anatoliy Burdiuhov at the Who is who in Crimea
 Anatoliy Bordiuhov: "I carry a relay baton" (Анатолий Бурдюгов: «Я несу эстафетную палочку»). Delo. 1 January 2007

1958 births
Living people
People from Odesa Oblast
Odesa National Economics University alumni
Our Ukraine (political party) politicians
Prime Ministers of Crimea